WJGK (103.1 FM) is a radio station located in Newburgh, New York, which plays mostly gold-based adult contemporary music. The station also has a wide playlist reaching into the Hot AC and Triple A charts.

Originally known as WFMN ("FM Newburgh"; on-air October 29, 1966), the station was owned by brothers Wilbur and Donald Nelson until 1973, when they sold out to Stereo Newburgh, Inc. The following year, WFMN was bought by WGNY (AM), eventually changing its calls to WGNY-FM in 1985, then to WJGK in 2010.

On February 14, 2002, at 12PM, WGNY-FM relaunched as Hits 103.1, The Best Hits and The Best Variety of the 80s, 90s and Today. On June 5, 2005, WGNY-FM started a simulcast with WTSX, a station located in Port Jervis, New York, relaunching first as The Fox 96.7 and Hits 103.1, then as Fox 96.7/103.1. It was at one time also known as The Fox 103.1-Your Adult Pop Alternative. WJGK's studios and transmitter are located in New Windsor, New York. On or around September 16, 2020, the station changed its name to Energy 103, under a Hot AC format.

References

External links 

JGK
Hot adult contemporary radio stations in the United States
Radio stations established in 1966
1966 establishments in New York (state)